Samus is a genus of sea sponges. It is the only genus in the monotypic family Samidae and is represented by a single species, Samus anonymus.

References

Tetractinellida